A double digital option is a particular variety of option (a financial derivative).  At maturity, the payoff is 1 if the spot price of the underlying asset is between two numbers, the lower and upper strikes of the option; otherwise, it is 0.

A double digital option is similar to the exotic option with a few exceptions. for instance a double digital option has two strike prices that is the expected price during the trade season. The option has two types of strikes namely the lower and the upper strikes.

A double digital with lower strike K1 and upper strike K2 can be replicated by going long a digital option with strike K1 and short another digital option with strike K2.

References

Options (finance)